The Heartland Collegiate Athletic Conference men's basketball tournament is the annual conference basketball championship tournament for the NCAA Division III Heartland Collegiate Athletic Conference. The tournament has been held annually since 1999. It is a single-elimination tournament and seeding is based on regular conference season records.

The winner, declared conference champion, receives the HCAC's automatic bid to the NCAA Men's Division III Basketball Championship.

Results

Championship records

 Earlham has not yet qualified for the HCAC tournament finals
 Wabash and Wilmington (OH) never qualified for the tournament finals as members of the HCAC

References

NCAA Division III men's basketball conference tournaments
Heartland Collegiate Athletic Conference
Recurring sporting events established in 1999